Rick Flag is the name of three fictional characters appearing in American comic books published by DC Comics. They are father, son, and grandson.

The father, Richard Flag, was in the original Suicide Squad, a World War II unit. After the war, he was a member of Task Force X. His son, Captain Rick Flag Jr., was a member of the Forgotten Heroes and led two different incarnations of the Suicide Squad.

The character made his live-action debut in the television series Smallville, portrayed by Ted Whittall. In the DC Extended Universe, Rick Flag is portrayed by Joel Kinnaman in the films Suicide Squad (2016) and The Suicide Squad (2021).

Fictional character biography

Rick Flag Sr.

Richard Montgomery Flag led a division in World War II called the Suicide Squadron. In his first mission, Flag was the only survivor. After that his team enjoyed increasing success and decreasing casualties. After the war, he married Sharon Race. In 1951, with the disappearance of the Justice Society of America and other super-heroes, President Harry S. Truman again called on Flag when he created Task Force X.

Task Force X would have two units: the military unit "Argent" (led by "Control"), and the civilian unit "Suicide Squad" which would deal with civilian matters — masked villains and the like. Commander Jeb Stuart would lead the military side to deal with national and international crises. Though Argent's recorded activity ceased after 1960, Stuart's Suicide Squad continued on. Eventually, Flag sacrificed himself in stopping the former Blackhawks' nemesis, the War Wheel.

Rick Flag Jr.

Flag was replaced in the Squad by his now-grown son, Richard Rogers Flag. Young Rick headed a new, public team which included his girlfriend, Karin Grace, Dr. Hugh Evans, and Jess Bright. In one tragic mission in Cambodia they were pursued by a Yeti. Evans and Bright and the Yeti fell into a crevasse, presumably to their deaths. Bright survived, angered at being left behind.

Bright, frostbitten and near-death, was found by the Chinese who nursed him back to health. He was then passed onto the Russians who transformed him into the bionic monster called Koshchei the Deathless. With his expertise in engineering, Bright assisted in the creation of the Rocket Red Brigade and lent a hand to the nation of Qurac in assembling their metahuman team, the Onslaught. Grace also secretly bore Flag's son and placed him with an adoptive family. Later, Rick was sent to infiltrate the Forgotten Heroes as a spy for the government. After the "death" of the Forgotten Heroes' leader, the Immortal Man, the team disbanded and Flag worked covertly for the U.S. government.

Rick Flag Jr. was then tapped by the government to lead the new Suicide Squad as formed by Amanda Waller, a role he reluctantly assumed. Immediately, Rick showed signs of instability, which were worsened when Karin Grace became the team's medic. Flag hated working with the criminals under his command, and resented the notion that he and Deadshot were alike in any way.

There were bright points amongst the Suicide Squad however, as the team was not completely filled with criminals. Nightshade, although she resented Flag at first when she was forced to become an accessory to murder when she became an undercover operative in the Jihad, grew attracted to him. She was never able to admit her feelings to him however, and he took no notice.

Flag also held good relationships with Nemesis and the Bronze Tiger, even though both were in some ways opposed to Flag. Although Nemesis had feelings for Nightshade, something to which Flag was oblivious, he stepped out of the way and respected Nightshade's feelings. Similarly, the Tiger was originally tapped to become the Squad's leader, but was instead replaced by Flag, something that the Tiger had no problems with.

The loyalty Flag had towards his teammates and Waller was evident in the fact that he did not shy away from a conflict with the Justice League in order to free Nemesis from Soviet captivity. He also threatened a bureaucrat who was threatening Waller's position.

This did nothing to ease Flag's mental instability, and it soon worsened. Flag led a different Squad in a deadly mission involving the Doom Patrol in which he was the only survivor. The death of Karin Grace also served to amplify this and it came to a head when US Senator Cray threatened to reveal the existence of the Suicide Squad to the public.

Unbeknownst to him, Amanda Waller had already dealt with the threat, and Flag set out to assassinate Cray in order to ensure the existence of the Suicide Squad, even though he loathed some of its members. The Squad set out to stop him, with the clearance to do so by any means necessary. The villain Deadshot found Flag and Cray, but instead of killing Flag, Deadshot instead murdered the senator. Flag was forced to flee, and unwittingly, the existence of the Suicide Squad was still revealed.

Flag set out to destroy the Jihad team once and for all after learning that his father had previously attacked their stronghold, Jotunheim, during World War II in order to neutralise a Nazi prototype nuclear weapon. He left a note to Nightshade detailing his plans. The bomb was still there, buried under rubble and the Jihad were unaware of its presence. Flag sneaked in and killed his way through to the bomb itself. He battled the Jihad's leader Rustam personally, just before the bomb exploded.

After his death, Flag appeared in an issue of Captain Atom, where his soul was saved from an eternity in Purgatory and reunited with Karin in Paradise. His Purgatory self also appears in the Day of Judgement, limited series. Along with other Purgatory bound souls, he battles heavenly agents on the behalf of a still living superhero team. As stated in issue five of the series, his rebellious actions earned him another after-life chance.

One Year Later in Checkmate (vol. 2) #6, Rick Flag is revealed to be alive and is rescued from a secret Quraci prison by the Bronze Tiger. He had been imprisoned there for four years until Amanda Waller discovered him and alerted the Tiger to his whereabouts. Rick was later revealed to be leading a clandestine Suicide Squad unit at the behest of Amanda Waller, and against the expressed mandate of the Checkmate organization.

Bob Greenberger, who co-created the Suicide Squad alongside John Ostrander, has publicly objected to the resurrection of Rick Flag. According to Greg Rucka, Rick Flag's subsequent re-appearance had nothing to do with Infinite Crisis, and John Ostrander has stated that he knew how Rick Flag could survive the explosion at Jotunheim when he first wrote it.

As seen in Suicide Squad: Raise the Flag #2, Rustam used his Scimitar to teleport both Rick Flag and himself to Skartaris. In Raise the Flag #5, General Wade Eiling admits that Rick Flag Jr. is not actually the son of Rick Flag Sr., but is a soldier named Anthony Miller who was brainwashed by Eiling into believing he was Flag's son. Miller's conditioning means that Eiling still has control of him, and uses him as part of his takeover of the Suicide Squad. Forced to activate an explosive implant in Amanda Waller's brain, Miller breaks free from his mind control enough to activate Eiling's implant instead, leaving him helpless enough to be captured. Confronted with the possibility to give up his presumed identity and return home, Miller decides that the Suicide Squad needs a Rick Flag, and refuses the offer.

Rick Flag III

Rick Flag Jr.'s young son by Karin Grace who also shared his name was kidnapped by Koschei the Deathless, a member of the Jihad, but was rescued by Nemesis of the Suicide Squad. Later, when Flag Jr. and Bronze Tiger visited Richard Flag III's adopted home, Flag Jr. refused to approach him.

In other media

Television
 Colonel Rick Flag Jr. appears in the Justice League Unlimited episode "Task Force X", voiced by Adam Baldwin. He recruits Captain Boomerang, Clock King, Deadshot, and Plastique for a mission to steal the Annihilator automaton from the Justice League's Watchtower for Amanda Waller and Project Cadmus.
 Rick Flag appears in Smallville, portrayed by Ted Whittall. This version's real name is Richard Stafford and the leader of the Suicide Squad, who initially work for Amanda Waller before being blackmailed into working for Chloe Sullivan and rescuing the Justice League.
 Rick Flag Sr. will appear in the DC Universe (DCU) animated miniseries Creature Commandos for HBO Max as a member of the eponymous team.

Film
 Rick Flag Sr. appears in Justice League: The New Frontier, voiced by Lex Lang. This version is Hal Jordan's instructor and co-pilot during a mission to Mars. When the spaceship is damaged, Flag reveals that their cargo includes weapon stockpiles in the event that the Martians are hostile. Under orders to detonate the stockpile in the event of a malfunction, Flag and Jordan come to blows until Jordan is saved by Superman when the ship enters the Earth's atmosphere and Flag uses the last of his strength to detonate the stockpile. Additionally, a young Rick Flag Jr. makes a cameo in the end of the film.
 Colonel Rick Flag appears in the DC Extended Universe (DCEU) film Suicide Squad, portrayed by Joel Kinnaman. This version is a Special Forces officer. He is hired by Amanda Waller to watch over June Moone, with whom he falls in love, and is later tasked with leading the Suicide Squad on field missions. After Moone is taken over by the Enchantress, he leads the squad on a mission to save her and foil the witch's plan to conquer the world.
 Rick Flag appears again in the soft-reboot DCEU film The Suicide Squad, portrayed again by Joel Kinnaman. He leads a new iteration of the squad on a mission to destroy a Corto Maltese prison called Jötunheim that is conducting inhumane experiments. Upon learning the U.S. government funded the experiments however, he attempts to retrieve a hard drive containing the information and leak it, only to be killed by Peacemaker, whom Waller secretly assigned to scrub the information.

Video games
Rick Flag Jr. appears in Batman: Arkham Origins Blackgate, voiced again by Adam Baldwin. He and Amanda Waller monitor Batman's work at Blackgate Penitentiary. In a post-credits scene, he and Waller recruit Deadshot and Bronze Tiger into the Suicide Squad.

References

External links
 Rick Flag at DC Comics' official website
 
 
 

Articles about multiple fictional characters
Fictional United States Army Special Forces personnel
Comics characters introduced in 1959
DC Comics superheroes
Fictional sole survivors
Fictional World War II veterans
Characters created by Robert Kanigher
Characters created by Ross Andru
Suicide Squad members
DC Comics film characters
DC Comics military personnel
Fictional characters from Virginia